The primary urethral groove or urethral groove is a temporary linear indentation on the underside (ventral side) of the male penis during embryonic development.

In humans, it typically appears around 8 weeks of gestation and becomes closed into a normal male urethra by the 12th week.

Clinical significance
Failure of complete closure can be associated with hypospadias.

References

Embryology of urogenital system
Human penis